The Cardigan District of Boroughs was a parliamentary constituency in Wales which returned one Member of Parliament (MP)  to the House of Commons of the Parliament of the United Kingdom and its predecessors, from 1542 until it was abolished for the 1885 general election. The borough constituency comprised the four towns of Cardigan, Aberystwyth, Lampeter and Adpar - geographically separated from each other but all within the county of Cardiganshire.

History
For much of its existence, the constituency was dominated by a relatively small number of landed families. During the eighteenth century, representation was keenly contested between the county families.

At the turn of the nineteenth century, the county town of Cardigan remained the largest of the boroughs with a population of 1,911 in 1801, and was controlled by the Earl of Lisburne. Lisburne's heir, John Vaughan, held the seat unopposed from 1796. However, Aberystwyth experienced rapid population growth in this period and its population reached 1,758 by 1801. Aberystwyth was under the influence of Edward Loveden Loveden, of Gogerddan. Loveden had obtained the estate through his marriage to Margaret Pryse, and coveted a parliamentary seat for his son, Pryse Loveden, who had adopted the name Pryse Pryse upon inheriting the estate upon his mother's death in 1796.

However, the Lisburne interest remained predominant until after the closely contested election of 1812, when Vaughan defeated Herbert Evans of Highmead by eighty votes.

After this contest, Vaughan's position became untenable, and it was assumed that he would not to contest the next election. In 1816, following the death of Thomas Johnes, the member for the county, Pryse Pryse of Gogerddan withdrew in favour of William Edward Powell of Nanteos, in order to avoid a contest. This was a political as well as a personal compromise, since Powell was a Tory and Pryse a Whig. In 1818, Pryse was elected unopposed for the boroughs, and held the seat for over thirty years. In 1832 the Reform Act resulted in a larger electorate as householders of homes worth over £10 were enfranchised in the boroughs. The constituency was still dominated by the Loveden-Pryse family of Gogerddan. Pryse Pryse held the seat from 1818 until his death in 1849, except for the 1841 election (see below). By agreement between Pryse and William Edward Powell, who continued as member for the county until his resignation in 1854, neither challenged the other's domination and so elections were almost always unopposed.

The one exception was the 1841 election when there was a close contest with John Harford, which was characterized by allegations of coercion. The contest was attended by a great deal of confusion. The poll books for Aberystwyth were either lost or stolen and never reached the returning officer, who came to the view that he should declare both candidates elected due to the uncertainty (the Conservative was slightly ahead in the polls from the other three parts). Neither of the two candidates could actually speak in the House of Commons until a committee determined the election, and it accepted the evidence that the Liberal candidate (Pryse) had outpolled the Conservative (Harford) by 305 to 285, enough to make his election secure, so he was given the seat.

In 1842, largely as a result of this episode, Pryse declared his support for the secret ballot.

Apart from 1855, when John Lloyd Davies won a byelection by 12 votes, the Conservatives never won the borough.

The last member to represent the constituency was David Davies from 1874 until 1885. When the county and borough constituencies were merged to form the Cardiganshire seat in 1885, David Davies comfortably won the election. In 1886, however, Davies joined the Liberal Unionists and was narrowly defeated at the General Election that year by the Liberal Party candidate.

Members of Parliament

Members of Parliament 1542-1640 
As there were sometimes significant gaps between Parliaments held in this period, the dates of first assembly and dissolution are given. Where the name of the member has not yet been ascertained or (before 1558) is not recorded in a surviving document, the entry unknown is entered in the table.

Members of Parliament 1640-1660
This sub-section includes the Long Parliament and the Rump Parliament, together with the Parliaments of the Commonwealth and the Protectorate (before the Convention Parliament of 1660).

Long Parliament

Election results

Elections in the 1830s

Elections in the 1840s

Originally, both Pryse and Harford were returned after the poll books for two polling stations at Aberystwyth were lost, with 226 votes recorded for Harford and 163 for Pryse. After extensive evidence, however, a committee determined the above results and Harford was declared unelected.

Pryse's death caused a by-election.

Elections in the 1850s

Loveden (as Pryse was known at the time) died, causing a by-election.

Elections in the 1860s

Elections in the 1870s

Elections in the 1880s

References

Sources
The Parliamentary History of the Principality of Wales

History of Ceredigion
Constituencies of the Parliament of the United Kingdom established in 1542
Constituencies of the Parliament of the United Kingdom disestablished in 1885
Historic parliamentary constituencies in Mid Wales